Nuno Filipe Ribeiro Teixeira (born 28 February 1998) known as Nuninho, is a Portuguese professional footballer who plays for Vitória Guimarães B as a forward.

Club career
On 7 October 2018, Nuninho made his professional debut with Vitória Guimarães B in a 2018–19 LigaPro match against
Varzim.

References

External links

1998 births
Living people
Portuguese footballers
Association football forwards
Liga Portugal 2 players
Segunda Divisão players
S.C. Salgueiros players
Vitória S.C. B players